Luke Alexander Matheson (born 3 October 2002) is an English professional footballer who plays as a defender for Premier League club Wolverhampton Wanderers.

Club career

Rochdale
Matheson was born in Fallowfield, Manchester. He attended Trinity Church of England High School in Hulme, Manchester. Progressing through Rochdale's academy, Matheson made his first-team debut on 4 September 2018, during their EFL Trophy group-stage tie against Bury at the age of 15 years and 336 days, making him the club's youngest ever debutant. As well as this, Matheson was awarded with the man-of-the-match award for his performance in the 2–1 victory.

On 19 January 2019, Matheson made his English Football League debut in a 1–1 League One draw at home to Fleetwood Town, as a half-time substitute for Matt Done.

On 25 September 2019, at the age of just 16, he scored the equaliser in a 1–1 draw against Manchester United in the EFL Cup third round at Old Trafford, which Dale eventually lost 5–3 on penalties. On 31 October, he signed a three-year professional contract with the club, having turned 17 earlier in the month.

Matheson scored his first league goal on 11 January 2020, opening a 2–0 home win over Bolton Wanderers.

Wolverhampton Wanderers
On 31 January 2020, Matheson signed for Premier League side Wolverhampton Wanderers, before re-joining Rochdale on loan for the remainder of the season. The transfer fee was £1 million.

Ipswich Town (loan)
On 1 February 2021, Matheson joined EFL League One side, Ipswich Town, on loan until the end of the season.He made his first appearance starting  in a 2–0 win against Blackpool.   He made two appearances for Ipswich before returning to Wolves at the end of his loan spell.

Hamilton Academical (loan)

On 27 August 2021, Matheson signed for Scottish club Hamilton Academical on a season-long loan. He played a total of nine Scottish Championship games and two games in the Scottish League Challenge Cup. He was recalled by Wolves to facilitate a move to Scunthorpe United.

Scunthorpe United (loan) 
On 15 January 2022, Matheson signed for League Two club Scunthorpe United, for the remainder of the season. This would see him reunite with ex-Rochdale boss, Keith Hill. He made his debut on the same day, playing the full 90 minutes in a 2–0 loss against Exeter City.

International career 
In February 2019, Matheson made his international debut for the England under-17 team against France.

On 11 October 2019, Matheson made his England U18 debut during a 5–2 win away to Poland.

Career statistics

References

2002 births
Living people
People from Fallowfield
Footballers from Manchester
English footballers
England youth international footballers
Association football defenders
Rochdale A.F.C. players
Ipswich Town F.C. players
Wolverhampton Wanderers F.C. players
English Football League players
Hamilton Academical F.C. players
Scunthorpe United F.C. players